Wang Fang is a Paralympian athlete from China competing mainly in category T36 sprint events.

She competed in the 2004 Summer Paralympics in Athens, Greece.  There she won a gold medal in the women's 100 metres - T36 event, a gold medal in the women's 200 metres - T36 event and a silver medal in the women's 400 metres - T38 event.  She also competed at the 2008 Summer Paralympics in Beijing, China.    There she won a gold medal in the women's 100 metres - T36 event and a gold medal in the women's 200 metres - T36 event

External links
 

Paralympic athletes of China
Athletes (track and field) at the 2004 Summer Paralympics
Athletes (track and field) at the 2008 Summer Paralympics
Paralympic gold medalists for China
Paralympic silver medalists for China
Chinese female sprinters
Year of birth missing (living people)
Living people
Medalists at the 2004 Summer Paralympics
Medalists at the 2008 Summer Paralympics
Paralympic medalists in athletics (track and field)
21st-century Chinese women